is a Japanese figure skater. He is the 2022 Olympic silver medalist, a two-time World silver medalist (2021, 2022), the 2020 Four Continents bronze medalist, and a three-time Japanese national bronze medalist (2019–20, 2020–21, 2021–22). On the junior level, he is the 2020 Youth Olympic champion, the 2020 World Junior silver medalist, and the 2019–20 Japan Junior national champion. Kagiyama is also a bronze medalist in the team event at the 2022 Winter Olympics. He is well known for his skating skills and consistency.

Personal life 
Yuma Kagiyama was born in Yokohama, Kanagawa, Japan. He is the son of two-time Olympian Masakazu Kagiyama. He skates for Chukyo University in Nagoya and Orientalbio. His hobbies include sleeping, gaming, listening to music, photography, and exercising. Kagiyama looks up to Yuzuru Hanyu, Shoma Uno and Nathan Chen.

Career 
Kagiyama began to skate at the age of 5. He is currently coached by his father, Masakazu Kagiyama.

2018–2019 season: International junior debut 
Kagiyama's coach, father Masakazu, suffered an intracerebral hemorrhage, was hospitalized for most of the season, and could not work on coaching the technical aspects. He instead spent time working with choreographer Misao Sato to improve his expression during this period.

Kagiyama opened his season at the 2018 Asian Open Trophy, where he won the junior title ahead of his teammate Tatsuya Tsuboi. He placed fourth at his first Junior Grand Prix event, 2018 JGP Canada. Kagiyama won his first JGP medal, a silver, at 2018 JGP Armenia.

He placed fifth at the 2018–19 Japan Junior Championships, and as a result, was invited to the senior championships. Kagiyama placed sixth at the senior level and was chosen as the first alternate for the 2019 World Junior Championships team. He competed as a senior at the 2019 International Challenge Cup and won the silver medal behind teammate Sōta Yamamoto.

2019–2020 season: Youth Olympic gold, World Junior silver, Four Continents bronze
Kagiyama won gold at 2019 JGP France with a new junior world record for the combined score. His total was 34.16 points higher than that of silver medalist Aleksa Rakic of Canada. His quadruple toe loop in the free skate set the junior record for the highest valued single jump, before being surpassed by Daniel Grassl's quadruple lutz at 2019 JGP Italy. Kagiyama set a new junior world record in the free skating at 2019 JGP Poland, and surpassed his junior world record for the total score. However, he eventually won silver behind Daniil Samsonov of Russia, who broke his junior world records for free skating and the total score after Kagiyama skated. Kagiyama's results qualified him to the 2019–20 Junior Grand Prix Final, where he placed fourth.

Kagiyama won gold at the 2019–20 Japan Junior Championships by over 37 points ahead of Shun Sato and Lucas Tsuyoshi Honda. As junior national champion, Kagiyama was named to represent Japan at the 2020 Winter Youth Olympics and the 2020 World Junior Championships. He was also invited to compete in the senior division at the 2019–20 Japan Championships, alongside the rest of the top six finishers in the junior division.

Competing at the 2019–20 Japan Championships, Kagiyama placed seventh in the short program and second in the free skate to win the senior national bronze medal. He was not selected to compete at the 2020 World Championships, but was assigned as one of Japan's three entries at the 2020 Four Continents Championships, in addition to his previously-earned berth to the 2020 World Junior Championships.

Kagiyama was chosen by the Japanese Olympic Committee as the flag-bearer for the Japanese national team at the 2020 Winter Youth Olympics. He won gold at the 2020 Winter Youth Olympics ahead of Russians Andrei Mozalev and Daniil Samsonov. Kagiyama was selected by draw to be a member of Team Focus for the team event. He won the men's free skating portion to help Team Focus win the silver medal.

At the Four Continents Championships, Kagiyama scored a personal-best 91.61 in his short program, beating his old mark by almost seven points and placing fifth in the segment.  He rose to the bronze medal overall in the free skate, his first senior ISU championship medal.

Finishing the season at the 2020 World Junior Championships, Kagiyama won the short program ahead of Andrei Mozalev.  After opening his free skate with a fall on a quad toe loop, he performed the remaining jumps successfully until singling a planned triple Axel as his closing jump and placed fifth in that segment.  He remained narrowly in second place overall, ahead of Petr Gumennik, and won the silver medal.

2020–2021 season: World silver 
Competing domestically, Kagiyama won gold at Kanto Regionals and the silver medal at the Eastern Sectionals championship, securing a berth at the national championships despite being a seeded skater. Kagiyama was assigned to make his Grand Prix debut at the 2020 NHK Trophy.  Kagiyama introduced the quad Salchow into competition in the short program, landing both it and his quad toe loop but singling a planned triple Axel.  He nevertheless placed first in the segment, 3.99 points ahead of Kazuki Tomono. In the free skate, he landed three quads cleanly, with his only error being singling a planned triple loop in a combination, but outscored second-place Tomono by almost 45 points, taking the gold medal overall by a 49-point margin.

At the 2020–21 Japan Championships, Kagiyama placed second in the short program behind Yuzuru Hanyu and ahead of Shoma Uno, who fell on his attempted jump combination.  He was third in the free skate behind Hanyu and Uno and won his second consecutive national bronze medal. As a result, Kagiyama was named to the 2021 World Championships team, alongside Hanyu and Uno.

Kagiyama's father and coach, Masakazu, had recovered from the effects of his intracerebral hemorrhage in June of 2018 that had prevented him from accompanying his son to international competitions since, and was able to travel to watch him compete in Stockholm. Kagiyama scored a personal best of 100.96 in the short program, landing two clean quads and a triple Axel to place behind Hanyu and in front of Nathan Chen. He subsequently won the small silver medal for the short program. In the free skate, he skated second-to-last behind Chen and held onto his second place, landing three clean quads and putting up a personal best of 190.81. He won the silver medal and became the youngest medalist at Worlds since Hanyu's bronze medal at the 2012 World Championships. Kagiyama's placement combined with Hanyu's bronze medal position qualified three berths for Japanese men at the 2022 Winter Olympics. Masakazu, whose personal best at the World Championships was sixth place in 1994, expressed approval that his son had bettered this on his first attempt.

Kagiyama also began working on a quad loop in the spring of 2020 and landed it successfully in practice. He then began to stabilize the quad loop and practice a quad Lutz, intending that the more stable quad would be added to his programs for the following season.

2021–2022 season: Beijing Olympics 
While practicing the quad Lutz in late August, Kagiyama suffered a bone contusion on his right hand that required a cast to be worn for two weeks. Despite this, he debuted his new programs at the domestic Gensan Summer Cup just a few days later, making several errors in both programs but finishing second overall. Kagiyama made his international season debut at the Asian Open Trophy in October. He skated an almost clean short program, with the only mistake being a doubled planned triple toe loop on the back of his combination, and took the lead. In the free skate, Kagiyama attempted the quad loop for the first time in competition, which was landed with a step out. He also made mistakes on two other quads but still won the free skate and the gold medal.

Kagiyama's first Grand Prix assignment was scheduled to be the 2021 Cup of China, but following its cancellation, he was reassigned to the 2021 Gran Premio d'Italia in Turin. Considered the pre-event favourite, he performed poorly in the short program, placing seventh of twelve after multiple jump errors. Kagiyama mounted a comeback in the free skate, his only error being a turnout on his opening quad Salchow attempt, winning that segment and the gold medal. His free skate score was a new personal best. At this second event, the 2021 Internationaux de France in Grenoble, Kagiyama won both segments of the competition to take his second Grand Prix gold of the season and defeat silver medalist and domestic rival Shun Sato by 21.42 points. Despite this convincing win, he said afterward that there was "much more regret than happiness" with regard to the second "disastrous" second half of his free skate, which featured three jump errors, including a singled attempt at a triple Axel.  His two gold medals qualified him for the Grand Prix Final, which he said was important for him as it was to be held in Japan. However, the Final was subsequently cancelled due to restrictions prompted by the Omicron variant.

At the 2021–22 Japan Championships, Kagiyama was third in the short program after falling on his quad toe loop attempt. He was second in the free skate, with his only error being a step out on a triple Axel, winning his third consecutive national bronze medal. Kagiyama was named to the Japanese Olympic team the following day.

Kagiyama made his debut at the 2022 Winter Olympics as the Japanese men's entry in the free skate segment of the Olympic team event. Kagiyama landed a quad loop, albeit with a turnout, but otherwise skated clean and won the segment with a new personal best score of 208.94 points, securing ten points for the Japanese team. He became the third skater to score over 200 points in the free skate under the post-2018 scoring system, after Nathan Chen and Yuzuru Hanyu. Despite this, Kagiyama vowed, "no matter how well I perform, no matter how I'm satisfied, I know there’s a few above me. I still have some catching up to do." Team Japan won the bronze medal, Kagiyama's first Olympic medal, and the first time the country had made the podium in the team event. Competing two days later in the men's event short program, he skated cleanly with a new personal best score of 108.12, finishing second in the segment. He said, "I thought I was going to be nervous, but I was having fun from beginning to the end." Kagiyama placed second in the free skate as well, making only one error when he stepped out of a quad loop, scoring 201.93 points for a combined score of 310.05, clearing 300 points for the first time. Reflecting on his experience with his father, Kagiyama said, "we've strived and experienced things together these past few years aiming for the Olympics. That led to me getting the sliver, and it was great sharing that joy."

Kagiyama concluded his season at the 2022 World Championships in Montpellier. With both Chen and Hanyu absent due to injury, Olympic medalists Shoma Uno and Kagiyama were rated as top contenders for the gold medal. Kagiyama turned out of the landing of his triple Axel in the short program but still ranked second in the segment with a score of 105.69, 3.94 points behind Uno. He struggled more with his jumps in the free, but was second in that segment as well, winning his second consecutive World silver medal.

2022–2023 season: Injury troubles 
Due to a left foot injury sustained over the summer, Kagiyama missed the Grand Prix series. In spite of this, he announced in early December that he intended to compete at the 2022–23 Japan Figure Skating Championships, against his father's advice to withdraw and prioritize recovery. Competing with reduced technical content, Kagiyama struggled somewhat with his jumps in both programs, singling a planned triple Axel in the short program and making mistakes on both quadruple Salchows in the free skate. He finished in eighth place. Despite what he deemed a "far from satisfactory" result, he stated he did not regret competing in the event and was now committed to fully healing his injury. He subsequently withdrew from the 2023 Winter World University Games to focus on recovery.

Records and achievements 
 Set the junior-level men's combined total record (234.87 points) at 2019 JGP France. Later surpassed by Kagiyama himself (245.35 points) at 2019 JGP Poland, before being surpassed by Daniil Samsonov at the same event.
 Set the junior-level men's free skating record (160.63 points) at 2019 JGP Poland. Later surpassed by Daniil Samsonov at the same event.

Programs

Competitive highlights 
GP: Grand Prix; JGP: Junior Grand Prix

2016-2017 to present

Novice level

Detailed results

Senior level

Junior level

References

External links
 
 

! colspan="3" style="border-top: 5px solid #78FF78;" |World Junior Record Holders

2003 births
Living people
Japanese male single skaters
World Figure Skating Championships medalists
Four Continents Figure Skating Championships medalists
World Junior Figure Skating Championships medalists
Youth Olympic gold medalists for Japan
Figure skaters at the 2020 Winter Youth Olympics
Medalists at the 2020 Winter Youth Olympics
Sportspeople from Nagano Prefecture
Olympic figure skaters of Japan
Figure skaters at the 2022 Winter Olympics
Medalists at the 2022 Winter Olympics
Olympic bronze medalists for Japan
Olympic silver medalists for Japan
Olympic medalists in figure skating
21st-century Japanese people